Haiti, officially the Republic of Haiti, and formerly known as Hayti, is a country located on the island of Hispaniola in the Greater Antilles archipelago of the Caribbean Sea, east of Cuba and Jamaica, and south of The Bahamas and the Turks and Caicos Islands. It occupies the western three-eighths of the island which it shares with the Dominican Republic. To its south-west lies the small Navassa Island, which is claimed by Haiti but is disputed as a United States territory under federal administration. The capital is Port-au-Prince.

The island was originally inhabited by the indigenous Taíno people, who originated in South America. The first Europeans arrived on 5 December 1492 during the first voyage of Christopher Columbus, who initially believed he had found India or China. Columbus subsequently founded the first European settlement in the Americas, La Navidad, on what is now the northeastern coast of Haiti. The island was claimed by Spain and named , forming part of the Spanish Empire until the early 17th century. However, competing claims and settlements by the French led to the western portion of the island being ceded to France in 1697, which was subsequently named . French colonists established lucrative sugarcane plantations, worked by vast numbers of slaves brought from Africa, which made the colony one of the richest in the world.

In the midst of the French Revolution (1789–99), slaves, maroons, and free people of color launched the Haitian Revolution (1791–1804), led by a former slave and the first black general of the French Army, Toussaint Louverture. After 12 years of conflict, Napoleon Bonaparte's forces were defeated by Louverture's successor, Jean-Jacques Dessalines (later Emperor Jacques I), who declared Haiti's sovereignty on 1 January 1804—the first independent nation of Latin America and the Caribbean, the second republic in the Americas, the first country in the Americas to abolish slavery, and the only state in history established by a successful slave revolt. Apart from Alexandre Pétion, the first President of the Republic, all of Haiti's first leaders were former slaves. After a brief period in which the country was split in two, President Jean-Pierre Boyer united the country and then attempted to bring the whole of Hispaniola under Haitian control, precipitating a long series of wars that ended in the 1870s when Haiti formally recognized the independence of the Dominican Republic.

Haiti's first century of independence was characterized by political instability, ostracism by the international community, and the payment of a crippling debt to France. Political volatility and foreign economic influence in the country prompted the United States to occupy the country from 1915 to 1934. Following a series of short-lived presidencies, François 'Papa Doc' Duvalier took power in 1956, ushering in a long period of autocratic rule continued by his son, Jean-Claude 'Baby Doc' Duvalier, that lasted until 1986; the period was characterized by state-sanctioned violence against the opposition and civilians, corruption, and economic stagnation. After 1986, Haiti began attempting to establish a more democratic political system.

Haiti is a founding member of the United Nations, Organization of American States (OAS), Association of Caribbean States, and the Organisation internationale de la Francophonie. In addition to CARICOM, it is a member of the International Monetary Fund, World Trade Organization, and the Community of Latin American and Caribbean States. Historically poor and politically unstable, Haiti has the lowest Human Development Index in the Americas, as well as widespread slavery. Since the turn of the 21st century, the country has endured a coup d'état, which prompted U.N. intervention, as well as a catastrophic earthquake that killed over 250,000 people and a cholera outbreak. With its deteriorating economic situation, as well as recent calls by the IMF to cut fuel subsidies, Haiti has been experiencing a socioeconomic and political crisis marked by riots and protests, widespread hunger, and increased gang activity. As of February 2023 Haiti has no elected government officials and has been described as a failed state.

Etymology
Haiti (also earlier Hayti) comes from the indigenous Taíno language, in which it means "land of high mountains" and named the entire island of Hispaniola. The name was restored by Haitian revolutionary Jean-Jacques Dessalines as the official name of independent Saint-Domingue, as a tribute to the Amerindian predecessors.

In French, the ï in Haïti has a diacritical mark (used to show that the second vowel is pronounced separately, as in the word naïve), while the H is silent. (In English, this rule for the pronunciation is often disregarded, thus the spelling Haiti is used.) There are different anglicizations for its pronunciation such as HIGH-ti, high-EE-ti and haa-EE-ti, which are still in use, but HAY-ti is the most widespread and best-established. In French, Haiti's nickname means the "Pearl of the Antilles" (La Perle des Antilles) because of both its natural beauty and the amount of wealth it accumulated for the Kingdom of France. During the 18th century, the colony was the world's leading producer of sugar and coffee.

In Haitian Creole, it is spelled and pronounced with a y but no H: .

Another theory on the name Haiti is its origin in African tradition, in Fon language one of the most spoken by the bossales (Haitians born in Africa to differentiate from the creoles or Haitians born in Haiti (St-Domingue) in early Haiti, Ayiti-Tomè means: From nowadays this land is our land.

In the Haitian community the country has multiple nicknames:  Ayiti-Toma (as its origin in Ayiti Tomè), Ayiti-Cheri (Ayiti my Darling), Tè-Desalin (Dessalines' Land) or Lakay (Home).

History

Taino history

The island of Hispaniola, of which Haiti occupies the western three-eighths, has been inhabited since about 5000 BC by groups of Native Americans thought to have arrived from Central or South America. Genetic studies show that some of these groups were related to the Yanomami of the Amazon Basin. Amongst these early settlers were the Ciboney peoples, followed by the Taíno, speakers of an Arawakan language, elements of which have been preserved in Haitian Creole. The Taíno name for the entire island was Haiti, or alternatively Quisqeya.In Taíno society the largest unit of political organization was led by a cacique, or chief, as the Europeans understood them. The island of Hispaniola was divided among five 'caciquedoms': the Magua in the north east, the Marien in the north west, the Jaragua in the south west, the Maguana in the central regions of Cibao, and the Higüey in the south east.
Historical Taíno names for areas include:
Guarico, now Limonade-Cap-Haitien
Bayaha, now Fort-Liberté
Xarama, now Port-de-Paix
Gonayibo, now Gonaives
Amani-y, now Saint-Marc
Yaguana, now Léoganes
Mamey, now Abricot
Yakimèl, now Jacmel

Taíno cultural artifacts include cave paintings in several locations in the country. These have become national symbols of Haiti and tourist attractions. Modern-day Léogâne, started as a French colonial town in the southwest, is beside the former capital of the caciquedom of Xaragua.

Colonial era

Spanish rule (1492–1625)

Navigator Christopher Columbus landed in Haiti on 6 December 1492, in an area that he named Môle-Saint-Nicolas, and claimed the island for the Crown of Castile. Nineteen days later, his ship the Santa María ran aground near the present site of Cap-Haïtien. Columbus left 39 men on the island, who founded the settlement of La Navidad on 25 December 1492. Relations with the native peoples, initially good, broke down and the settlers were later killed by the Taíno.

The sailors carried endemic Eurasian infectious diseases to which the native peoples lacked immunity, causing them to die in great numbers in epidemics. The first recorded smallpox epidemic in the Americas erupted on Hispaniola in 1507. Their numbers were further reduced by the harshness of the  system, in which the Spanish forced natives to work in gold mines and plantations.

The natives were brought to these sites to work in specific plantations or industries.

As the Spanish re-focused their colonization efforts on the greater riches of mainland Central and South America, Hispaniola became reduced largely to a trading and refueling post. As a result piracy became widespread, encouraged by European powers hostile to Spain such as France (based on Île de la Tortue) and England. The Spanish largely abandoned the western third of the island, focusing their colonization effort on the eastern two-thirds. The western part of the island was thus gradually settled by French buccaneers; among them was Bertrand d'Ogeron, who succeeded in growing tobacco and recruited many French colonial families from Martinique and Guadeloupe. In 1697 France and Spain settled their hostilities on the island by way of the Treaty of Ryswick of 1697, which divided Hispaniola between them.

French rule (1625–1804)

France received the western third and subsequently named it Saint-Domingue, the French equivalent of Santo Domingo, the Spanish colony on Hispaniola. The French set about creating sugar and coffee plantations, worked by vast numbers of slaves imported from Africa, and Saint-Domingue grew to become their richest colonial possession.

The French settlers were outnumbered by slaves by almost 10 to 1. According to the 1788 Census, Haiti's population consisted of nearly 25,000 Europeans, 22,000 free coloreds and 700,000 African slaves. In contrast, by 1763 the white population of French Canada, a far larger territory, had numbered only 65,000. In the north of the island, slaves were able to retain many ties to African cultures, religion and language; these ties were continually being renewed by newly imported Africans. Some West African slaves held on to their traditional Vodou beliefs by secretly syncretizing it with Catholicism.

The French enacted the Code Noir ("Black Code"), prepared by Jean-Baptiste Colbert and ratified by Louis XIV, which established rules on slave treatment and permissible freedoms. Saint-Domingue has been described as one of the most brutally efficient slave colonies; one-third of newly imported Africans died within a few years. Many slaves died from diseases such as smallpox and typhoid fever. They had low birth rates, and there is evidence that some women aborted fetuses rather than give birth to children within the bonds of slavery. The colony's environment also suffered, as forests were cleared to make way for plantations and the land was overworked so as to extract maximum profit for French plantation owners.

As in its Louisiana colony, the French colonial government allowed some rights to free people of color, the mixed-race descendants of European male colonists and African female slaves (and later, mixed-race women). Over time, many were released from slavery and they established a separate social class. White French Creole fathers frequently sent their mixed-race sons to France for their education. Some men of color were admitted into the military. More of the free people of color lived in the south of the island, near Port-au-Prince, and many intermarried within their community. They frequently worked as artisans and tradesmen, and began to own some property, including slaves of their own. The free people of color petitioned the colonial government to expand their rights.

The brutality of slave life led many slaves to escape to mountainous regions, where they set up their own autonomous communities and became known as Maroons. One Maroon leader, François Mackandal, led a rebellion in the 1750s, however he was later captured and executed by the French.

Haitian Revolution (1791–1804)

Inspired by the French Revolution of 1789 and principles of the rights of man, the French settlers and free people of color pressed for greater political freedom and more civil rights. Tensions between these two groups led to conflict, as a militia of free-coloreds was set up in 1790 by Vincent Ogé, resulting in his capture, torture and execution. Sensing an opportunity, in August 1791 the first slave armies were established in northern Haiti under the leadership of Toussaint Louverture inspired by the Vodou houngan (priest) Boukman, and backed by the Spanish in Santo Domingo – soon a full-blown slave rebellion had broken out across the entire colony.

In 1792, the French government sent three commissioners with troops to re-establish control; to build an alliance with the gens de couleur and slaves commissioners Léger-Félicité Sonthonax and Étienne Polverel abolished slavery in the colony. Six months later, the National Convention, led by Maximilien de Robespierre and the Jacobins, endorsed abolition and extended it to all the French colonies.

The United States, which was a new republic itself, oscillated between supporting or not supporting Toussaint Louverture and the emerging country of Haiti, depending on who was President of the US. Washington, who was a slave holder and isolationist, kept the United States neutral, although private US citizens at times provided aid to French planters trying to put down the revolt. John Adams, a vocal opponent of slavery, fully supported the slave revolt by providing diplomatic recognition, financial support, munitions and warships (including the USS Constitution) beginning in 1798. This support ended in 1801 when Jefferson, another slave-holding president, took office and recalled the US Navy.

With slavery abolished, Toussaint Louverture pledged allegiance to France, and he fought off the British and Spanish forces who had taken advantage of the situation and invaded Saint-Domingue. The Spanish were later forced to cede their part of the island to France under the terms of the Peace of Basel in 1795, uniting the island under one government. However an insurgency against French rule broke out in the east, and in the west there was fighting between Louverture's forces and the free people of color led by André Rigaud in the War of the Knives (1799–1800). More than 25,000 surviving free people of color left the island as refugees.

After Louverture created a separatist constitution and proclaimed himself governor-general for life, Napoléon Bonaparte in 1802 sent an expedition of 20,000 soldiers and as many sailors under the command of his brother-in-law, Charles Leclerc, to reassert French control. The French achieved some victories, but within a few months most of their army had died from yellow fever. Ultimately more than 50,000 French troops died in an attempt to retake the colony, including 18 generals. The French managed to capture Louverture, transporting him to France for trial. He was imprisoned at Fort de Joux, where he died in 1803 of exposure and possibly tuberculosis.

The slaves, along with free  and allies, continued their fight for independence, led by generals Jean-Jacques Dessalines, Alexandre Pétion and Henry Christophe. The rebels finally managed to decisively defeat the French troops at the Battle of Vertières on 18 November 1803, establishing the first nation ever to successfully gain independence through a slave revolt. Under the overall command of Dessalines, the Haitian armies avoided open battle, and instead conducted a successful guerrilla campaign against the Napoleonic forces, working with diseases such as yellow fever to reduce the numbers of French soldiers. Later that year France withdrew its remaining 7,000 troops from the island and Napoleon gave up his idea of re-establishing a North American empire, selling Louisiana (New France) to the United States, in the Louisiana Purchase. It has been estimated that between 24,000 and 100,000 Europeans, and between 100,000 and 350,000 Haitian ex-slaves, died in the revolution. In the process, Dessalines became arguably the most successful military commander in the struggle against Napoleonic France.

Independent Haiti

First Empire (1804–1806)

The independence of Saint-Domingue was proclaimed under the native name 'Haiti' by Jean-Jacques Dessalines on 1 January 1804 in Gonaïves and he was proclaimed "Emperor for Life" as Emperor Jacques I by his troops. Dessalines at first offered protection to the white planters and others. However, once in power, he ordered the massacre of nearly all the remaining white men, women, children; between January and April 1804, 3,000 to 5,000 whites were killed, including those who had been friendly and sympathetic to the black population. Only three categories of white people were selected out as exceptions and spared: Polish soldiers, the majority of whom had deserted from the French army and fought alongside the Haitian rebels; the small group of German colonists invited to the north-west region; and a group of medical doctors and professionals. Reportedly, people with connections to officers in the Haitian army were also spared, as well as the women who agreed to marry non-white men.

Fearful of the potential impact the slave rebellion could have in the slave states, U.S. President Thomas Jefferson refused to recognize the new republic. The Southern politicians who were a powerful voting bloc in the American Congress prevented U.S. recognition for decades until they withdrew in 1861 to form the Confederacy.

The revolution led to a wave of emigration. In 1809, 9,000 refugees from Saint-Domingue, both white planters and people of color, settled en masse in New Orleans, doubling the city's population, having been expelled from their initial refuge in Cuba by Spanish authorities. In addition, the newly arrived slaves added to the city's African population.

The plantation system was re-established in Haiti, albeit for wages, however many Haitians were marginalized and resented the heavy-handed manner in which this was enforced in the new nation's politics. The rebel movement splintered, and Dessalines was assassinated by rivals on 17 October 1806.

State of Haiti, Kingdom of Haiti and the Republic (1806–1820)

After Dessalines' death Haiti became split into two, with the Kingdom of Haiti in the north directed by Henri Christophe, later declaring himself Henri I, and a republic in the south centered on Port-au-Prince, directed by Alexandre Pétion, an homme de couleur. Christophe established a semi-feudal corvée system, with a rigid education and economic code. Pétion's republic was less absolutist, and he initiated a series of land reforms which benefited the peasant class. President Pétion also gave military and financial assistance to the revolutionary leader Simón Bolívar, which were critical in enabling him to liberate the Viceroyalty of New Granada. Meanwhile, the French, who had managed to maintain a precarious control of eastern Hispaniola, were defeated by insurgents led by Juan Sánchez Ramírez, with the area returning to Spanish rule in 1809 following the Battle of Palo Hincado.

Unification of Hispaniola (1821–1844)

Beginning in 1821, President Jean-Pierre Boyer, also an homme de couleur and successor to Pétion, reunified the island following the suicide of Henry Christophe. After Santo Domingo declared its independence from Spain on 30 November 1821, Boyer invaded, seeking to unite the entire island by force and ending slavery in Santo Domingo.

Struggling to revive the agricultural economy to produce commodity crops, Boyer passed the Code Rural, which denied peasant laborers the right to leave the land, enter the towns, or start farms or shops of their own, causing much resentment as most peasants wished to have their own farms rather than work on plantations.

Starting in September 1824, more than 6,000 African Americans migrated to Haiti, with transportation paid by an American philanthropic group similar in function to the American Colonization Society and its efforts in Liberia. Many found the conditions too harsh and returned to the United States.

In July 1825, King Charles X of France, during a period of restoration of the French monarchy, sent a fleet to reconquer Haiti. Under pressure, President Boyer agreed to a treaty by which France formally recognized the independence of the nation in exchange for a payment of 150 million francs. By an order of 17 April 1826, the King of France renounced his rights of sovereignty and formally recognized the independence of Haiti. The enforced payments to France hampered Haiti's economic growth for years, exacerbated by the fact that many Western nations continued to refuse formal diplomatic recognition to Haiti; Britain recognized Haitian independence in 1833, and the United States not until 1862. Haiti borrowed heavily from Western banks at extremely high interest rates to repay the debt. Although the amount of the reparations was reduced to 90 million in 1838, by 1900 80% of Haiti's government spending was debt repayment and the country did not finish repaying it until 1947.

Loss of the Spanish portion of the island

After losing the support of Haiti's elite, Boyer was ousted in 1843, with Charles Rivière-Hérard replacing him as president. Nationalist Dominican forces in eastern Hispaniola led by Juan Pablo Duarte seized control of Santo Domingo on 27 February 1844. The Haitian forces, unprepared for a significant uprising, capitulated to the rebels, effectively ending Haitian rule of eastern Hispaniola. In March Rivière-Hérard attempted to reimpose his authority, but the Dominicans put up stiff opposition and inflicted heavy losses. Rivière-Hérard was removed from office by the mulatto hierarchy and replaced with the aged general Philippe Guerrier, who assumed the presidency on 3 May 1844.

Guerrier died in April 1845, and was succeeded by General Jean-Louis Pierrot. Pierrot's most pressing duty as the new president was to check the incursions of the Dominicans, who were harassing the Haitian troops. Dominican gunboats were also making depredations on Haiti's coasts. President Pierrot decided to open a campaign against the Dominicans, whom he considered merely as insurgents, however the Haitian offensive of 1845 was stopped on the frontier.

On 1 January 1846 Pierrot announced a fresh campaign to reimpose Haitian suzerainty over eastern Hispaniola, but his officers and men greeted this fresh summons with contempt. Thus, a month later – February 1846 – when Pierrot ordered his troops to march against the Dominicans, the Haitian army mutinied, and its soldiers proclaimed his overthrow as president of the republic. With the war against the Dominicans having become very unpopular in Haiti, it was beyond the power of the new president, General Jean-Baptiste Riché, to stage another invasion.

Second Empire (1849–1859)

On 27 February 1847, President Riché died after only a year in power and was replaced by an obscure officer, General Faustin Soulouque. During the first two years of Soulouque's administration the conspiracies and opposition he faced in retaining power were so manifold that the Dominicans were given a further breathing space in which to consolidate their independence. But, when in 1848 France finally recognized the Dominican Republic as a free and independent state and provisionally signed a treaty of peace, friendship, commerce and navigation, Haiti immediately protested, claiming the treaty was an attack upon their own security. Soulouque decided to invade the new Republic before the French Government could ratify the treaty.

On 21 March 1849, Haitian soldiers attacked the Dominican garrison at Las Matas. The demoralized defenders offered almost no resistance before abandoning their weapons. Soulouque pressed on, capturing San Juan. This left only the town of Azua as the remaining Dominican stronghold between the Haitian army and the capital. On 6 April, Azua fell to the 18,000-strong Haitian army, with a 5,000-man Dominican counterattack failing to oust them. The way to Santo Domingo was now clear. But the news of discontent existing at Port-au-Prince, which reached Soulouque, arrested his further progress and caused him to return with the army to his capital.

Emboldened by the sudden retreat of the Haitian army, the Dominicans counter-attacked. Their flotilla went as far as Dame-Marie, which they plundered and set on fire. Soulouque, now self-proclaimed as Emperor Faustin I, decided to start a new campaign against them. In 1855, he again invaded the territory of the Dominican Republic. But owing to insufficient preparation, the army was soon in want of victuals and ammunition. In spite of the bravery of the soldiers, the Emperor had once more to give up the idea of a unified island under Haitian control. After this campaign, Britain and France intervened and obtained an armistice on behalf of the Dominicans, who declared independence as the Dominican Republic.

The sufferings endured by the soldiers during the campaign of 1855, and the losses and sacrifices inflicted on the country without yielding any compensation or any practical results provoked great discontent. In 1858 a revolution began, led by General Fabre Geffrard, Duke of Tabara. In December of that year, Geffrard defeated the Imperial Army and seized control of most of the country. As a result, the Emperor abdicated his throne on 15 January 1859. Refused aid by the French Legation, Faustin was taken into exile aboard a British warship on 22 January 1859, and General Geffrard succeeded him as president.

Late 19th century–early 20th century

The period following Soulouque's overthrow down to the turn of the century was a turbulent one for Haiti, with repeated bouts of political instability. President Geffrard was overthrown in a coup in 1867, as was his successor, Sylvain Salnave, in 1869. Under the Presidency of Michel Domingue (1874–76) relations with the Dominican Republic were dramatically improved by the signing of a treaty, in which both parties acknowledged the independence of the other, bringing an end to Haitian dreams of bringing the entirety of Hispaniola under their control. Some modernisation of the economy and infrastructure also occurred in this period, especially under the Presidencies of Lysius Salomon (1879–1888) and Florvil Hyppolite (1889–1896).

Haiti's relations with outside powers were often strained. In 1889 the United States attempted to force Haiti to permit the building of a naval base at Môle Saint-Nicolas, which was firmly resisted by President Hyppolite. In 1892 the German government supported suppression of the reform movement of Anténor Firmin, and in 1897, the Germans used gunboat diplomacy to intimidate and then humiliate the Haitian government of President Tirésias Simon Sam (1896–1902) during the Lüders Affair.

In the first decades of the 20th century, Haiti experienced great political instability and was heavily in debt to France, Germany and the United States. A series of short lived presidencies came and went: President Pierre Nord Alexis was forced from power in 1908, as was his successor François C. Antoine Simon in 1911; President Cincinnatus Leconte (1911–12) was killed in a (possibly deliberate) explosion at the National Palace; Michel Oreste (1913–14) was ousted in a coup, as was his successor Oreste Zamor in 1914.

United States occupation (1915–1934)

Germany increased its influence in Haiti in this period, with a small community of German settlers wielding disproportionate influence in Haiti's economy. The German influence prompted anxieties in the United States, who had also invested heavily in the country, and whose government defended their right to oppose foreign interference in the Americas under the Monroe Doctrine. In December 1914, the Americans removed $500,000 from the Haitian National Bank, but rather than seize it to help pay the debt, it was removed for safe-keeping in New York, thus giving the United States control of the bank and preventing other powers from doing so. This gave a stable financial base on which to build the economy, and so enable the debt to be repaid.

In 1915, Haiti's new President Vilbrun Guillaume Sam sought to strengthen his tenuous rule by a mass execution of 167 political prisoners. Outrage at the killings led to riots, and Sam was captured and killed by a lynch mob. Fearing possible foreign intervention, or the emergence of a new government led by the anti-American Haitian politician Rosalvo Bobo, President Woodrow Wilson sent U.S. Marines into Haiti in July 1915. The , under Rear Admiral Caperton, arrived in Port-au-Prince in an attempt to restore order and protect U.S. interests. Within days, the Marines had taken control of the capital city and its banks and customs house. The Marines declared martial law and severely censored the press. Within weeks, a new pro-U.S. Haitian president, Philippe Sudré Dartiguenave, was installed and a new constitution written that was favorable to the interests of the United States. The constitution (written by future US President Franklin D. Roosevelt) included a clause that allowed, for the first time, foreign ownership of land in Haiti, which was bitterly opposed by the Haitian legislature and citizenry.

The occupation improved some of Haiti's infrastructure and centralized power in Port-au-Prince. 1700 km of roads were made usable, 189 bridges were built, many irrigation canals were rehabilitated, hospitals, schools, and public buildings were constructed, and drinking water was brought to the main cities. Port-au-Prince became the first Caribbean city to have a phone service with automatic dialling. Agricultural education was organized, with a central school of agriculture and 69 farms in the country. However, many infrastructure projects were built using the corvée system that allowed the government/occupying forces to take people from their homes and farms, at gunpoint if necessary, to build roads, bridges etc. by force, a process that was deeply resented by ordinary Haitians. Sisal was also introduced to Haiti, and sugarcane and cotton became significant exports, boosting prosperity. Haitian traditionalists, based in rural areas, were highly resistant to U.S.-backed changes, while the urban elites, typically mixed-race, welcomed the growing economy, but wanted more political control. Together they helped secure an end to the occupation in 1934, under the Presidency of Sténio Vincent (1930–1941). The debts were still outstanding, though less due to increased prosperity, and the U.S. financial advisor-general receiver handled the budget until 1941.

The U.S. Marines were instilled with a special brand of paternalism towards Haitians "expressed in the metaphor of a father's relationship with his children." Armed opposition to the US presence was led by the cacos under the command of Charlemagne Péralte; his capture and execution in 1919 earned him the status of a national martyr. During Senate hearings in 1921, the commandant of the Marine Corps reported that, in the 20 months of active unrest, 2,250 Haitians had been killed. However, in a report to the Secretary of the Navy, he reported the death toll as being 3,250. Haitian historians have claimed the true number was much higher, but this is not supported by most historians outside Haiti.

Recognition of the distinctive traditionalism of the Haitian people had an influence on American writers, including Eugene O'Neill, James Weldon Johnson, Langston Hughes, Zora Neale Hurston and Orson Welles.

Post-occupation era (1934–1957)
After US forces left in 1934, Dominican dictator Rafael Trujillo used anti-Haitian sentiment as a nationalist tool. In an event that became known as the Parsley Massacre, he ordered his army to kill Haitians living on the Dominican side of the border. Few bullets were used – instead, 20,000–30,000 Haitians were bludgeoned and bayoneted, then herded into the sea, where sharks finished what Trujillo had begun. Congressman Hamilton Fish, ranking member of the House Foreign Affairs Committee, called the Parsley Massacre "the most outrageous atrocity that has ever been perpetrated on the American continent."

President Vincent became increasingly dictatorial, and resigned under US pressure in 1941, being replaced by Élie Lescot (1941–46). In 1941, during the Second World War, Lescot declared war on Japan (8 December), Germany (12 December), Italy (12 December), Bulgaria (24 December), Hungary (24 December) and Romania (24 December). Out of these six Axis countries, only Romania reciprocated, declaring war on Haiti on the same day (24 December 1941). On 27 September 1945, Haiti became a founding member of the United Nations (the successor to the League of Nations, of which Haiti was also a founding member).

In 1946 Lescot was overthrown by the military, with Dumarsais Estimé later becoming the new president (1946–50). He sought to improve the economy and education, and to boost the role of black Haitians, however as he sought to consolidate his rule he too was overthrown in a coup led by Paul Magloire, who replaced him as president (1950–56). Firmly anti-Communist, he was supported by the United States; with greater political stability tourists started to visit Haiti. The waterfront area of Port-au-Prince was redeveloped to allow cruise ship passengers to walk from the docks to cultural attractions. Celebrities such as Truman Capote and Noël Coward visited Haiti; the era is captured in Graham Greene's 1966 novel The Comedians.

Duvalier dynasty (1957–1986)

In 1956–57 Haiti underwent severe political turmoil; Magloire was forced to resign and leave the country in 1956 and he was followed by four short-lived presidencies. In the September 1957 election Dr. François Duvalier was elected President of Haiti. Known as 'Papa Doc' and initially popular, Duvalier remained President until his death in 1971. He advanced black interests in the public sector, where over time, people of color had predominated as the educated urban elite. Not trusting the army, despite his frequent purges of officers deemed disloyal, Duvalier created a private militia known as Tontons Macoutes ("Bogeymen"), which maintained order by terrorizing the populace and political opponents. In 1964 Duvalier proclaimed himself 'President for Life'; an uprising against his rule that year in Jérémie was violently suppressed, with the ringleaders publicly executed and hundreds of mixed-raced citizens in the town killed. The bulk of the educated and professional class began leaving the country, and corruption became widespread. Duvalier sought to create a personality cult, identifying himself with Baron Samedi, one of the loa (or lwa), or spirits, of Haitian Vodou. Despite the well-publicized abuses under his rule, Duvalier's firm anti-Communism earned him the support of the Americans, who furnished the country with aid.

In 1971 Duvalier died, and he was succeeded by his son Jean-Claude Duvalier, nicknamed 'Baby Doc', who ruled until 1986. He largely continued his father's policies, though curbed some of the worst excesses in order to court international respectability. Tourism, which had nosedived in Papa Doc's time, again became a growing industry. However as the economy continued to decline Baby Doc's grip on power began to weaken. Haiti's pig population was slaughtered following an outbreak of swine fever in the late 1970s, causing hardship to rural communities who used them as an investment. The opposition became more vocal, bolstered by a visit to the country by Pope John Paul II in 1983, who publicly lambasted the president. Demonstrations occurred in Gonaïves in 1985 which then spread across the country; under pressure from the United States, Duvalier left the country for France in February 1986.

In total, roughly 40,000 to 60,000 Haitians are estimated to have been killed during the reign of the Duvaliers. Through the use of his intimidation tactics and executions, many intellectual Haitians had fled, leaving the country with a massive brain-drain that it has yet to recover from.

Post-Duvalier era (1986–2004)
Following Duvalier's departure, army leader General Henri Namphy headed a new National Governing Council. Elections scheduled for November 1987 were aborted after dozens of inhabitants were shot in the capital by soldiers and Tontons Macoutes. Fraudulent elections followed in 1988, in which only 4% of the citizenry voted. The newly elected president, Leslie Manigat, was then overthrown some months later in the June 1988 Haitian coup d'état. Another coup followed in September 1988, after the St. Jean Bosco massacre in which 13–50 people (estimates vary) attending a mass led by prominent government critic and Catholic priest Jean-Bertrand Aristide were killed. General Prosper Avril subsequently led a military regime until March 1990.

In December 1990 Jean-Bertrand Aristide was elected president in the Haitian general election. However his ambitious reformist agenda worried the elites, and in September of the following year he was overthrown by the military, led by Raoul Cédras, in the 1991 Haitian coup d'état. Amidst the continuing turmoil many Haitians attempted to flee the country.

In September 1994, the United States negotiated the departure of Haiti's military leaders and the peaceful entry of 20,000 US troops under Operation Uphold Democracy. This enabled the restoration of the democratically elected Jean-Bertrand Aristide as president, who returned to Haiti in October to complete his term. As part of the deal Aristide had to implement free market reforms in an attempt to improve the Haitian economy, with mixed results, some sources stating that these reforms had a negative impact on native Haitian industry. In November 1994, Hurricane Gordon brushed Haiti, dumping heavy rain and creating flash flooding that triggered mudslides. Gordon killed an estimated 1,122 people, although some estimates go as high as 2,200.

Elections were held in 1995 which were won by René Préval, gaining 88% of the popular vote, albeit on a low turnout. Aristide subsequently formed his own party, Fanmi Lavalas, and political deadlock ensued; the November 2000 election returned Aristide to the presidency with 92% of the vote. The election had been boycotted by the opposition, then organized into the Convergence Démocratique, over a dispute in the May legislative elections. In subsequent years, there was increasing violence between rival political factions and human rights abuses. Aristide spent years negotiating with the Convergence Démocratique on new elections, but the Convergence's inability to develop a sufficient electoral base made elections unattractive.

In 2004 an anti-Aristide revolt began in northern Haiti. The rebellion eventually reached the capital, and Aristide was forced into exile. The precise nature of the events are disputed; some, including Aristide and his bodyguard, Franz Gabriel, stated that he was the victim of a "new coup d'état or modern kidnapping" by U.S. forces. Mrs. Aristide stated that the kidnappers wore U.S. Special Forces uniforms, but changed into civilian clothes upon boarding the aircraft that was used to remove Aristide from Haiti. These charges were denied by the US government. As political violence and crime continued to grow, a United Nations Stabilisation Mission (MINUSTAH) was brought in to maintain order. However MINUSTAH proved controversial, as their at times heavy-handed approach to maintaining law and order and several instances of abuses, including the alleged sexual abuse of civilians, provoked resentment and distrust among ordinary Haitians. Boniface Alexandre assumed interim authority until 2006, when René Préval was re-elected President following elections.

Post-Aristide era (2004–present)
Amidst the continuing political chaos, a series of natural disasters hit Haiti. In 2004 Tropical Storm Jeanne skimmed the north coast, leaving 3,006 people dead in flooding and mudslides, mostly in the city of Gonaïves. In 2008 Haiti was again struck by tropical storms; Tropical Storm Fay, Hurricane Gustav, Hurricane Hanna and Hurricane Ike all produced heavy winds and rain, resulting in 331 deaths and about 800,000 in need of humanitarian aid. The state of affairs produced by these storms was intensified by already high food and fuel prices that had caused a food crisis and political unrest in April 2008.

On 12 January 2010, at 4:53 pm local time, Haiti was struck by a magnitude-7.0 earthquake. This was the country's most severe earthquake in over 200 years. The earthquake was reported to have left between 160,000 and 300,000 people dead and up to 1.6 million homeless. The situation was exacerbated by a subsequent massive cholera outbreak that was triggered when cholera-infected waste from a United Nations peacekeeping station contaminated the country's main river, the Artibonite. In 2017, it was reported that roughly 10,000 Haitians had died and nearly a million had been made ill. After years of denial the United Nations apologized in 2016, but , they have refused to acknowledge fault, thus avoiding financial responsibility.

General elections had been planned for January 2010 but were postponed due to the earthquake. Elections were held on 28 November 2010 for the senate, the parliament and the first round of the presidential elections. The run-off between Michel Martelly and Mirlande Manigat took place on 20 March 2011, and preliminary results, released on 4 April, named Michel Martelly the winner. In 2011 both former dictator Jean-Claude Duvalier and Jean-Bertrand Aristide returned to Haiti; attempts to try Duvalier for crimes committed under his rule were shelved following his death in 2014. In 2013, Haiti called for European nations to pay reparations for slavery and establish an official commission for the settlement of past wrongdoings. Meanwhile, after continuing political wrangling with the opposition and allegations of electoral fraud, Martelly agreed to step down in 2016 without a successor in place. An interim president, Jocelerme Privert, then took office. After numerous postponements, partly owing to the effects of devastating Hurricane Matthew, elections were eventually held in November 2016. The victor, Jovenel Moïse of the Haitian Tèt Kale Party, was subsequently sworn in as president in 2017. The 2018–2021 Haitian protests are demonstrations in cities throughout Haiti that began on 7 July 2018, in response to increased fuel prices. Over time these protests evolved into demands for the resignation of president Moïse.

On 7 July 2021, President Moïse was assassinated in an attack on his private residence, and First Lady Martine Moïse was hospitalized following the overnight attack. Amid the political crisis, the government of Haiti installed Ariel Henry, previously nominated by President Moïse, as prime minister. In August 2021, Haiti suffered another huge earthquake, with many casualties. The earthquake has also damaged Haiti's economic conditions and led to a rise in violent crimes in the country. As of March 2022, Haiti still had no president, no parliamentary quorum, and a dysfunctional high court due to a lack of judges. In 2022, protests broke out against the government and rising fuel prices.

Geography

Haiti forms the western three-eighths of Hispaniola, the second largest island in the Greater Antilles. At  Haiti is the third largest country in the Caribbean behind Cuba and the Dominican Republic, the latter sharing a  border with Haiti. The country has a roughly horseshoe shape and because of this it has a disproportionately long coastline, second in length behind Cuba in the Greater Antilles.

Haiti is the most mountainous nation in the Caribbean, its terrain consists of mountains interspersed with small coastal plains and river valleys. The climate is tropical, with some variation depending on altitude.

The northern region or Marien Region consists of the Massif du Nord (Northern Massif) and the Plaine du Nord (Northern Plain). The Massif du Nord is an extension of the Cordillera Central in the Dominican Republic. It begins at Haiti's eastern border, north of the Guayamouc River, and extends to the northwest through the northern peninsula. The lowlands of the Plaine du Nord lie along the northern border with the Dominican Republic, between the Massif du Nord and the North Atlantic Ocean.

The central region or Artibonite Region consists of two plains and two sets of mountain ranges. The Plateau Central (Central Plateau) extends along both sides of the Guayamouc River, south of the Massif du Nord. It runs from the southeast to the northwest. To the southwest of the Plateau Central are the Montagnes Noires, whose most northwestern part merges with the Massif du Nord. Haiti's most important valley in terms of crops is the Plaine de l'Artibonite, which lies between the Montagnes Noires and the Chaîne des Matheux. This region supports the country's (also Hispaniola's) longest river, the Riviere l'Artibonite, which begins in the western region of the Dominican Republic and continues for most of its length through central Haiti, where it then empties into the Golfe de la Gonâve. Also in this valley lies Haiti's second largest lake, Lac de Péligre, formed as a result of the construction of the Péligre Dam in the mid-1950s.

The southern region or Xaragua Region consists of the Plaine du Cul-de-Sac (the southeast) and the mountainous southern peninsula (also known as the Tiburon Peninsula). The Plaine du Cul-de-Sac is a natural depression that harbors the country's saline lakes, such as Trou Caïman and Haiti's largest lake, Étang Saumatre. The Chaîne de la Selle mountain range – an extension of the southern mountain chain of the Dominican Republic (the Sierra de Baoruco) – extends from the Massif de la Selle in the east to the Massif de la Hotte in the west.

Haiti also includes several offshore islands. The island of Tortuga (Île de la Tortue) is located off the coast of northern Haiti. The arrondissement of La Gonâve is located on the island of the same name, in the Golfe de la Gonâve; Haiti's largest island, Gonâve is moderately populated by rural villagers. Île à Vache (Cow Island) is located off the southwest coast; also part of Haiti are the Cayemites, located in the Gulf of Gonâve north of Pestel.

Climate

Haiti's climate is tropical with some variation depending on altitude. The rainfall pattern is varied, with rain heavier in some of the lowlands and the northern and eastern slopes of the mountains. Haiti's dry season occurs from November to January.

There are two rainy seasons, April–June and October–November. Haiti is subject to periodic droughts and floods, made more severe by deforestation. Hurricanes are a menace, and the country is also prone to flooding and earthquakes.

Geology

There are blind thrust faults associated with the Enriquillo-Plantain Garden fault system over which Haiti lies. After the earthquake of 2010, there was no evidence of surface rupture and geologists' findings were based on seismological, geological and ground deformation data.

The strike-slip fault system in the region has two branches in Haiti, the Septentrional-Oriente fault in the north and the Enriquillo-Plantain Garden fault in the south.

A 2007 earthquake hazard study, noted that the Enriquillo-Plantain Garden fault zone could be at the end of its seismic cycle and concluded that a worst-case forecast would involve a 7.2 Mw earthquake, similar in size to the 1692 Jamaica earthquake. A study team presented a hazard assessment of the Enriquillo-Plantain Garden fault system to the 18th Caribbean Geologic Conference in March 2008, noting the large strain. The team recommended "high priority" historical geologic rupture studies, as the fault was fully locked and had recorded few earthquakes in the preceding 40 years. An article published in Haiti's Le Matin newspaper in September 2008 cited comments by geologist Patrick Charles to the effect that there was a high risk of major seismic activity in Port-au-Prince; and duly the magnitude 7.0 2010 Haiti earthquake happened on this fault zone on 12 January 2010.

Haiti also has rare elements such as gold, which can be found at The Mont Organisé gold mine.

Haiti has no currently active volcanoes. "In the Terre-Neuve Mountains, about 12 kilometers from the Eaux Boynes, small intrusions at least as late as Oligocene and probably of Miocene age are known. No other volcanic activity of as late a date is known near any of the other warm springs."

Environment

The soil erosion released from the upper catchments and deforestation have caused periodic and severe flooding in Haiti, as experienced, for example, on 17 September 2004. Earlier in May that year, floods had killed over 3,000 people on Haiti's southern border with the Dominican Republic.

Haiti's forests covered 60% of the country as recently as 50 years ago, but that has been halved to a current estimate of 30% tree cover, according to more recent environmental analysis. This estimate poses a stark difference from the erroneous figure of 2% which has been oft-cited in discourse concerning the country's environmental condition. Haiti had a 2019 Forest Landscape Integrity Index mean score of 4.01/10, ranking it 137th globally out of 172 countries.

Scientists at the Columbia University's Center for International Earth Science Information Network (CIESIN) and the United Nations Environment Programme are working on the Haiti Regenerative Initiative an initiative aiming to reduce poverty and natural disaster vulnerability in Haiti through ecosystem restoration and sustainable resource management.

Biodiversity

Haiti is home to four ecoregions: Hispaniolan moist forests, Hispaniolan dry forests, Hispaniolan pine forests, and Greater Antilles mangroves.

Despite its small size, Haiti's mountainous terrain and resultant multiple climatic zones has resulted in a wide variety of plant life. Notable tree species include the breadfruit tree, mango tree, acacia, mahogany, coconut palm, royal palm and West Indian cedar. The forests were formerly much more extensive, but have been subject to severe deforestation.

Most mammal species are not native, having been brought to the island since colonial times. However there are various native bat species, as well as the endemic Hispaniolan hutia and Hispaniolan solenodon. Various whale and dolphin species can also be found off Haiti's coast.

There are over 260 species of bird, 31 of these being endemic to Hispaniola. Notable endemic species include the Hispaniolan trogon, Hispaniolan parakeet, grey-crowned tanager and the Hispaniolan Amazon. There are also several raptor species, as well as pelicans, ibis, hummingbirds and ducks.

Reptiles are common, with species such as the rhinoceros iguana, Haitian boa, American crocodile and gecko.

Government and politics

The government of Haiti is a semi-presidential republic, a multiparty system wherein the president of Haiti is head of state and elected directly by popular elections held every five years. The prime minister of Haiti acts as head of government and is appointed by the president, chosen from the majority party in the National Assembly. Executive power is exercised by the president and prime minister who together constitute the government.

Legislative power is vested in both the government and the two chambers of the National Assembly of Haiti, the Senate (Sénat) and the Chamber of Deputies (Chambre des Députés). The government is organized unitarily, thus the central government delegates powers to the departments without a constitutional need for consent. The current structure of Haiti's political system was set forth in the Constitution of Haiti on 29 March 1987.

Haitian politics have been contentious: since independence, Haiti has suffered 32 coups. Haiti is the only country in the Western Hemisphere to undergo a successful slave revolution; however, a long history of oppression by dictators such as François Duvalier and his son Jean-Claude Duvalier has markedly affected the nation. Since the end of the Duvalier era Haiti has been transitioning to a democratic system.

Administrative divisions 

Administratively, Haiti is divided into ten departments. The departments are listed below, with the departmental capital cities in parentheses.

 Nord-Ouest (Port-de-Paix)
 Nord (Cap-Haïtien)
 Nord-Est (Fort-Liberté)
 Artibonite (Gonaïves)
 Centre (Hinche)
 Ouest (Port-au-Prince)
 Grand'Anse (Jérémie)
 Nippes (Miragoâne)
 Sud (Les Cayes)
 Sud-Est (Jacmel)

The departments are further divided into 42 arrondissements, 145 communes and 571 communal sections. These serve as, respectively, second- and third-level administrative divisions.

Foreign relations

Haiti is a member of a wide range of international and regional organizations, such as the United Nations, CARICOM, Community of Latin American and Caribbean States, International Monetary Fund, Organisation of American States, Organisation internationale de la Francophonie, OPANAL and the World Trade Organization.

In February 2012, Haiti signaled it would seek to upgrade its observer status to full associate member status of the African Union (AU). The AU was reported to be planning to upgrade Haiti's status from observer to associate at its June 2013 summit but the application had still not been ratified by May 2016.

Military

Haiti has a strong military history dating to the pre-independence struggle. The Indigenous Army is essential in the construction of the state the management of land and public finances. Up to the 20th century, every Haitian president was an officer in the army. During the US intervention, the army was remodeled as Gendarmerie d'Haiti and later on as Force Armée d'Haiti (FAdH). In the early '90s, the army was unconstitutionally decommissioned and replaced by the Haitian National Police (PNH). In 2018, Président Jovenel Moise reactivated the FAdH.

Haiti's Ministry of Defense is the main body of the armed forces. The former Haitian Armed Forces were demobilized in 1995, however efforts to reconstitute it are currently underway. The current defense force for Haiti is the Haitian National Police, which has a highly trained SWAT team, and works alongside the Haitian Coast Guard. In 2010, the Haitian National Police force numbered 7,000.

Law enforcement and crime

The legal system is based on a modified version of the Napoleonic Code.

Haiti has consistently ranked among the most corrupt countries in the world on the Corruption Perceptions Index. According to a 2006 report by the Corruption Perceptions Index, there is a strong correlation between corruption and poverty in Haiti. The nation ranked first of all countries surveyed for levels of perceived domestic corruption. It is estimated that President "Baby Doc" Duvalier, his wife Michele, and their agents stole US $504 million from the country's treasury between 1971 and 1986. Similarly, after the Haitian Army folded in 1995, the Haitian National Police (HNP) gained sole power of authority on the Haitian citizens. Many Haitians as well as observers of the Haitian society believe that this monopolized power could have given way to a corrupt police force.

Similarly, some media outlets alleged that millions were stolen by former president Jean-Bertrand Aristide. In March 2004, at the time of Aristide's kidnapping, a BBC article wrote that the Bush administration State Department stated that Aristide had been involved in drug trafficking. The BBC also described pyramid schemes, in which Haitians lost hundreds of millions in 2002, as the "only real economic initiative" of the Aristide years.

Conversely, according to the 2013 United Nations Office on Drugs and Crime (UNODC) report, murder rates in Haiti (10.2 per 100,000) are far below the regional average (26 per 100,000); less than  that of Jamaica (39.3 per 100,000) and nearly  that of the Dominican Republic (22.1 per 100,000), making it among the safer countries in the region. In large part, this is due to the country's ability to fulfil a pledge by increasing its national police yearly by 50%, a four-year initiative that was started in 2012. In addition to the yearly recruits, the Haitian National Police (HNP) has been using innovative technologies to crack down on crime. A notable bust in recent years led to the dismantlement of the largest kidnapping ring in the country with the use of an advanced software program developed by a West Point-trained Haitian official that proved to be so effective that it has led to its foreign advisers to make inquiries.

In 2010, the New York City Police Department (NYPD) sent a team of veteran officers to Haiti to assist in the rebuilding of its police force with special training in investigative techniques, strategies to improve the anti-kidnapping personnel and community outreach to build stronger relationships with the public especially among the youth. It has also helped the HNP set up a police unit in the center of Delmas, a neighborhood of Port-au-Prince.

In 2012 and 2013, 150 HNP officers received specialized training funded by the US government, which also contributed to the infrastructure and communications support by upgrading radio capacity and constructing new police stations from the most violent-prone neighborhoods of Cité Soleil and Grande Ravine in Port-au-Prince to the new northern industrial park at Caracol.

Haitian penitentiary system 
Port-au-Prince penitentiary is home to half of Haiti's prisoners. The prison has a capacity of 1,200 detainees but  the penitentiary was obliged to keep 4,359 detainees, a 454% occupancy level. This leads to severe consequences for the inmates.

One cell could hold up to 60 inmates which was originally designed for only 18, therefore creating tight and uncomfortable living conditions. The inmates are forced to create makeshift hammocks from the wall and ceilings. The men are on a 22/ 23 hour lock up in the cells so the risk of diseases is very high. The inability to receive sufficient funds from the government as Haiti endures severe natural disasters which take up their attention and resources, such as the 2010 earthquake, has caused deadly cases of malnutrition, combined with the tight living conditions, increases the risk of infectious diseases such as tuberculosis which has led to 21 deaths in January 2017 alone at the Port-au-Prince penitentiary.

Haitian law states that once arrested, one must go before a judge within 48 hours; however, this is very rare. In an interview with Unreported World, the prison governor stated that around 529 detainees were never sentenced, there are 3,830 detainees who are in prolonged detained trial detention. Therefore, 80% are not convicted.

Unless families are able to provide the necessary funds for inmates to appear before a judge there is a very slim chance the inmate would have a trial, on average, within 10 years. Brian Concannon, the director of the non-profit Institute for Justice and Democracy in Haiti, claims that without a substantial bribe to persuade judges, prosecutors and lawyers to undergo their case, there is no prospect for getting a trial for years.

Families may send food to the penitentiary; however, most inmates depend on the meals served twice a day. However, the majority of the meals consist of ration supplies of rice, oats or cornmeal, which has led to deadly cases of malnutrition-related ailments such as beriberi and anemia. Prisoners too weak are crammed in the penitentiary infirmary.

In confined living spaces for 22–23 hours a day, inmates are not provided with latrines and are forced to defecate into plastic bags and leave them outside their cells. These conditions were considered inhumane by the Inter-American Court of Human Rights in 2008.

Economy

Haiti has a highly regulated, predominantly state-controlled economy, ranking 145th out of the 177 countries given a "freedom index" by the Heritage Foundation. Haiti's per capita GDP is $1,800 and its GDP is $19.97 billion (2017 estimates). The country uses the Haitian gourde as its currency. Despite its tourism industry, Haiti is one of the poorest countries in the Americas, with corruption, political instability, poor infrastructure, lack of health care and lack of education cited as the main causes. Unemployment is high and many Haitians seek to emigrate. Trade declined dramatically after the 2010 earthquake and subsequent outbreak of cholera, with the country's purchasing power parity GDP falling by 8% (from US$12.15 billion to US$11.18 billion). Haiti ranked 145th of 182 countries in the 2010 United Nations Human Development Index, with 57.3% of the population being deprived in at least three of the HDI's poverty measures.

Following the disputed 2000 election and accusations about President Aristide's rule, US aid to the Haitian government was cut off between 2001 and 2004. After Aristide's departure in 2004, aid was restored and the Brazilian army led a United Nations Stabilization Mission in Haiti peacekeeping operation. After almost four years of recession, the economy grew by 1.5% in 2005. In September 2009, Haiti met the conditions set out by the IMF and World Bank's Heavily Indebted Poor Countries program to qualify for cancellation of its external debt.

More than 90 percent of the government's budget comes from an agreement with Petrocaribe, a Venezuela-led oil alliance.

Foreign aid

Haiti received more than US$4 billion in aid from 1990 to 2003, including US$1.5 billion from the United States. The largest donor is the US, followed by Canada and the European Union. In January 2010, following the earthquake, US President Barack Obama promised US$1.15 billion in assistance. European Union nations pledged more than €400 million (US$616 million). Neighboring Dominican Republic has also provided extensive humanitarian aid to Haiti, including the funding and construction of a public university, human capital, free healthcare services in the border region, and logistical support after the 2010 earthquake.

The United Nations states that in total US$13.34 billion has been earmarked for post-earthquake reconstruction through 2020, though two years after the 2010 quake, less than half of that amount had actually been released, according to UN documents. , the US government has allocated US$4 billion, US$3 billion has already been spent, and the rest is dedicated to longer-term projects.

Trade
According to the 2015 CIA World Factbook, Haiti's main import partners are: Dominican Republic 35%, US 26.8%, Netherlands Antilles 8.7%, China 7% (est. 2013). Haiti's main export partner is the US 83.5% (est. 2013). Haiti had a trade deficit of US$3 billion in 2011, or 41% of GDP.

Energy

In 1925, the city of Jacmel was the first area in the Caribbean to have electricity and was subsequently dubbed the City of Light.

Today, Haiti relies heavily on an oil alliance with Petrocaribe for much of its energy requirements. In recent years, hydroelectric, solar and wind energy have been explored as possible sustainable energy sources.

As of 2017, among all the countries in the Americas, Haiti is producing the least energy. Less than a quarter of the country has electric coverage. Most regions of Haiti that do have energy are powered by generators. These generators are often expensive and produce a lot of pollution. The areas that do get electricity experience power cuts on a daily basis, and some areas are limited to 12 hours of electricity a day. Electricity is provided by a small number of independent companies: Sogener, E-power, and Haytrac. There is no national electricity grid within the country. The most common source of energy used is wood, along with charcoal. In Haiti, about 4 million metric tons of wood products are consumed yearly. Like charcoal and wood, petroleum is also an important source of energy for Haiti. Since Haiti cannot produce its own fuel, all fuel is imported. Yearly, around 691,000 tons of oil is imported into the country.

On 31 October 2018, Evenson Calixte, the General Director of energy regulation (ANARSE) announced the 24 hour electricity project. To meet this objective, 236 MW needs to installed in Port-au-Prince alone, with an additional 75 MW needed in all other regions in the country. Presently only 27.5% of the population has access to electricity; moreover, the national energy agency l'Électricité d'Haïti (Ed'H) is only able to meet 62% of overall electricity demand said Fritz Caillot, the Minister of Public Works, Transportation and Communication (Travaux publics, transport et communication (TPTC)).

Personal income

Haiti suffers from a shortage of skilled labor, widespread unemployment, and underemployment. Most Haitians in the labor force have informal jobs. Three-quarters of the population lives on US$2 or less per day.

Remittances from Haitians living abroad are the primary source of foreign exchange, equaling one-fifth (20%) of GDP and more than five times the earnings from exports as of 2012. In 2004, 80% or more of college graduates from Haiti were living abroad.

Occasionally, families who are unable to care for children financially may send them to live with a wealthier family as a restavek, or house servant. In return the family are supposed to ensure that the child is educated and provided with food and shelter, however the system is open to abuse and has proved controversial, with some likening it to child slavery.

Real estate
In rural areas, people often live in wooden huts with corrugated iron roofs. Outhouses are located in back of the huts. In Port-au-Prince, colorful shantytowns surround the central city and go up the mountainsides.

The middle and upper classes live in suburbs, or in the central part of the bigger cities in apartments, where there is urban planning. Many of the houses they live in are like miniature fortresses, located behind walls embedded with metal spikes, barbed wire, broken glass, and sometimes all three. The gates to these houses are barred at night, the house is locked; guard dogs patrol the yard. These houses are often self-sufficient as well. The houses have backup generators, because the electrical grid in Haiti is unreliable. Some even have rooftop reservoirs for water, as the water supply is also unreliable.

Agriculture

Haiti is the world's leading producer of vetiver, a root plant used to make luxury perfumes, essential oils and fragrances, providing for half the world's supply. Roughly 40–50% of Haitians work in the agricultural sector. However, According to soil surveys by the United States Department of Agriculture in the early 1980s, only 11.3 percent of the land was highly suitable for crops. Haiti relies upon imports for half its food needs and 80% of its rice.

Haiti exports crops such as mangoes, cacao, coffee, papayas, mahogany nuts, spinach, and watercress. Agricultural products constitute 6% of all exports. In addition, local agricultural products include maize, beans, cassava, sweet potato, peanuts, pistachios, bananas, millet, pigeon peas, sugarcane, rice, sorghum, and wood.

Currency

The Haitian gourde (HTG) is the national currency. The "Haitian dollar" equates to 5 gourdes (goud), which is a fixed exchange rate that exists in concept only, but are commonly used as informal prices. The vast majority of the business sector and individuals in Haiti will also accept US dollars, though at the outdoor markets gourdes may be preferred. Locals may refer to the USD as "dollar américain" (dola ameriken) or "dollar US" (pronounced oo-es).

Tourism

The tourism market in Haiti is undeveloped and the government is heavily promoting this sector. Haiti has many of the features that attract tourists to other Caribbean destinations, such as white sand beaches, mountainous scenery and a year-round warm climate. However, the country's poor image overseas, at times exaggerated, has hampered the development of this sector. In 2014, the country received 1,250,000 tourists (mostly from cruise ships), and the industry generated US$200 million in 2014.

Several hotels were opened in 2014, including an upscale Best Western Premier, a five-star Royal Oasis hotel by Occidental Hotel and Resorts in Pétion-Ville, a four-star Marriott Hotel in the Turgeau area of Port-au-Prince and other new hotel developments in Port-au-Prince, Les Cayes, Cap-Haïtien and Jacmel.

The Haitian Carnival has been one of the most popular carnivals in the Caribbean. In 2010, the government decided to stage the event in a different city outside Port-au-Prince every year in an attempt to decentralize the country. The National Carnival usually held in one of the country's largest cities (i.e., Port-au-Prince, Cap-Haïtien or Les Cayes) follows the also very popular Jacmel Carnival, which takes place a week earlier in February or March.

Caracol Industrial Park
On 21 October 2012, Haitian President Michel Martelly, US Secretary of State Hillary Clinton, Bill Clinton, Richard Branson, Ben Stiller and Sean Penn inaugurated the  Caracol industrial park, the largest in the Caribbean. Costing US$300 million, the project, which includes a 10-megawatt power plant, a water-treatment plant and worker housing, is intended to transform the northern part of the country by creating 65,000 jobs.

The park is part of a "master plan" for Haiti's North and North-East departments, including the expansion of the Cap-Haïtien International Airport to accommodate large international flights, the construction of an international seaport in Fort-Liberté and the opening of the $50 million Roi Henri Christophe Campus of a new university in Limonade (near Cap-Haïtien) on 12 January 2012.

South Korean clothing manufacturer Sae-A Trading Co. Ltd, one of the park's main tenants, has created 5,000 permanent jobs out of the 20,000 projected and has built 8,600 houses in the surrounding area for its workers. The industrial park ultimately has the potential to create as many as 65,000 jobs once fully developed.

Infrastructure

Transportation

Haiti has two main highways that run from one end of the country to the other. The northern highway, Route Nationale No. 1 (National Highway One), originates in Port-au-Prince, winding through the coastal towns of Montrouis and Gonaïves, before reaching its terminus at the northern port Cap-Haïtien. The southern highway, Route Nationale No. 2, links Port-au-Prince with Les Cayes via Léogâne and Petit-Goâve. The state of Haiti's roads are generally poor, many being potholed and becoming impassable in rough weather.

According to The Washington Post, "Officials from the U.S. Army Corps of Engineers said Saturday [23 January 2010] that they assessed the damage from the [12 January] quake in Port-au-Prince, Haiti, and found that many of the roads aren't any worse than they were before because they've always been in poor condition."

The port at Port-au-Prince, Port international de Port-au-Prince, has more registered shipping than any of the other dozen ports in the country. The port's facilities include cranes, large berths, and warehouses, but these facilities are not in good condition. The port is underused, possibly due to the substantially high port fees. The port of Saint-Marc is currently the preferred port of entry for consumer goods coming into Haiti. Reasons for this may include its location away from volatile and congested Port-au-Prince, as well as its central location relative to numerous Haitian cities.

In the past, Haiti used rail transport, however the rail infrastructure was poorly maintained when in use and cost of rehabilitation is beyond the means of the Haitian economy. In 2018 the Regional Development Council of the Dominican Republic proposed a "trans-Hispaniola" railway between both countries.

Airports

It has Haiti's main jetway, and along with Cap-Haïtien International Airport located near the northern city of Cap-Haïtien, handles the vast majority of the country's international flights. Cities such as Jacmel, Jérémie, Les Cayes, and Port-de-Paix have smaller, less accessible airports that are serviced by regional airlines and private aircraft. Such companies include: Caribintair (defunct), Sunrise Airways and Tortug' Air (defunct).

In 2013, plans for the development of an international airport on Île-à-Vache were introduced by the Prime Minister.

Bus service

Tap tap buses are colorfully painted buses or pick-up trucks that serve as share taxis. The "tap tap" name comes from the sound of passengers tapping on the metal bus body to indicate they want off. These vehicles for hire are often privately owned and extensively decorated. They follow fixed routes, do not leave until filled with passengers, and riders can usually disembark at any point. The decorations are a typically Haitian form of art.

In August 2013, the first coach bus prototype was made in Haiti.

Communications

In Haiti, communications include the radio, television, fixed and mobile telephones, and the Internet. Haiti ranked last among North American countries in the World Economic Forum's Network Readiness Index (NRI) an indicator for determining the development level of a country's information and communication technologies. Haiti ranked number 143 out of 148 overall in the 2014 NRI ranking, down from 141 in 2013.

Water supply and sanitation 

Haiti faces key challenges in the water supply and sanitation
sector:
Notably, access to public services is very low, their quality is inadequate and public institutions remain very weak despite foreign aid and the government's declared intent to strengthen the sector's institutions. Foreign and Haitian NGOs play an important role in the sector, especially in rural and urban slum areas.

Demographics

In 2018, Haiti's population was estimated to be about 10,788,000. In 2006, half of the population was younger than age 20. In 1950, the first formal census gave a total population of 3.1 million. Haiti averages approximately 350 people per square kilometer (~900 per sq mi), with its population concentrated most heavily in urban areas, coastal plains, and valleys.

Most Haitians are descendants of former black African slaves, including Mulattoes who are mixed-race. The remainder are of European or Arab descent, the descendants of settlers (colonial remnants and immigration during the era of the two World Wars).

At the time of the Haitian Revolution, an event that involved the eradication of whites (mostly French) in Haiti, many of the blacks in Haiti were African-born and had no non-African ancestry. This was because the average African slave in colonial Haiti had a short life span and France continuously imported thousands of Africans yearly to keep the slave population up, by 1790 there were nearly 600,000 slaves, outnumbering whites about 20 to 1.

Millions of Haitian descent live abroad in the United States, Dominican Republic, Cuba, Canada (primarily Montreal), Bahamas, France, the French Antilles, the Turks and Caicos, Jamaica, Puerto Rico, Venezuela, Brazil, Suriname and French Guiana. There were an estimated 881,500 people of Haitian ancestry in the United States in 2015, while in the Dominican Republic there were an estimated 800,000 in 2007. There were 300,000 in Cuba in 2013, 100,000 in Canada in 2006, 80,000 in Metropolitan France (2010), and up to 80,000 in the Bahamas (2009). There are also smaller Haitian communities in many other countries, including Chile, Switzerland, Japan and Australia.

In 2018, the life expectancy at birth was 63.66 years.

Population genetics

Autosomal DNA
The gene pool of Haiti is about 95.5% Sub-Saharan African, 4.3% European, with the rest showing some traces of East Asian genes; according to a 2010 autosomal genealogical DNA testing.

Y-chromosome and mitochondrial DNA

A 2012 genetic study on Haitian Y-chromosomal ancestry has revealed that the population "exhibit a predominantly Sub-Saharan paternal component, with haplogroups A1b-V152, A3-M32, B2-M182, E1a-M33, E1b1a-M2, E2b-M98, and R1b2-V88" accounting for 77.2% of the Haitian paternal gene pools. Y-chromosomes indicative of European ancestry "(i.e., haplogroups G2a*-P15, I-M258, R1b1b-M269, and T-M184) were detected at commensurate levels at 20.3%,
Levantine Y-haplogroups were also found.

Duffy antigens
According to a 2008 study examining the frequency of the Duffy antigen receptor for Chemokines (DARC) single-nucleotide polymorphisms (SNPs), 75% of Haitian women sampled exhibited the CC genotype (absent among women of European ancestry) at levels comparable to US African-Americans (73%), but more than Jamaican females (63%).

Racial discrimination

Under colonial rule, Haitian mulattoes were generally privileged above the black majority, though they possessed fewer rights than the white population. Following the country's independence, they became the nation's social elite. Numerous leaders throughout Haiti's history have been mulattoes. During this time, the slaves and the affranchis were given limited opportunities toward education, income, and occupations, but even after gaining independence, the social structure remains a legacy today as the disparity between the upper and lower classes have not been reformed significantly since the colonial days. Making up 5% of the nation's population, mulattoes have retained their preeminence, evident in the political, economic, social and cultural hierarchy in Haiti. As a result, the elite class today consists of a small group of influential people who are generally light in color and continue to establish themselves in high, prestigious positions.

Religion

The 2017 CIA Factbook reported that around 54.7% of Haitians professed to being Catholics while Protestants made up about 28.5% of the population (Baptist 15.4%, Pentecostal 7.9%, Seventh-day Adventist 3%, Methodist 1.5%, other 0.7%). Other sources put the Protestant population higher than this, suggesting that it might have formed one-third of the population in 2001. Like other countries in Latin America, Haiti has witnessed a general Protestant expansion, which is largely Evangelical and Pentecostal in nature.

Haitian Cardinal Chibly Langlois is president of the National Bishops Conference of the Catholic Church.

Vodou, a religion with West African roots similar to those of Cuba and Brazil, is practiced by some Haitians today. It originated during colonial times in which slaves were obliged to disguise their loa (lwa), or spirits, as Catholic saints, an element of a process called syncretism. Due to the religious syncretism between Catholicism and Vodou, it is difficult to estimate the number of Vodouists in Haiti. The religion has historically been persecuted and misrepresented in popular media; nevertheless, in 2003 the Haitian government recognized the faith as an official religion of the nation.

Many Catholics and Protestants in Haiti denounce Vodou as devil worship, but do not deny the power of such spirits. Instead, they regard them as adversaries who are "evil" and "satanic", which they are often encouraged to pray against. Protestants view Catholic veneration of saints as idol worship, and some Protestants would often destroy statues and other Catholic paraphernalia.

Minority religions in Haiti include Islam, Bahá'í Faith, Judaism, and Buddhism.

Languages
The two official languages of Haiti are French and Haitian Creole. French is the principal written and administratively authorized language (as well as the main language of the press) and is spoken by 42% of Haitians. It is spoken by all educated Haitians, is the medium of instruction in most schools, and is used in the business sector. It is also used in ceremonial events such as weddings, graduations and church Masses. Haiti is one of two independent nations in the Americas (along with Canada) to designate French as an official language; the other French-speaking areas are all overseas départements, or collectivités, of France, such as French Guiana. Haitian Creole is spoken by nearly all of the Haitian population. French, the base language for Haitian Creole, is popular among the Haitian elite and upper classes. French is also popular in the business sector, and to a far lesser degree, English due to American influence. Spanish is spoken by some Haitians who live along the Haitian-Dominican border. English and Spanish may also be spoken by Haitian deportees from the United States and various Latin American countries. Overall, about 90–95% of Haitians only speak Haitian Creole/French fluently, with over half only knowing Creole.

Haitian Creole, which has recently undergone a standardization, is spoken by virtually the entire population of Haiti. Haitian Creole is one of the French-based creole languages. Its vocabulary is 90% derived from French, but its grammar resembles that of some West African languages. It also has influences from Taino, Spanish, and Portuguese. Haitians often colloquially call Haitian Creole Kreyòl. Haitian Creole is related to the other French creoles, but most closely to the Antillean Creole and Louisiana Creole variants.

Emigration

There is a large Haitian diaspora community, predominantly based in the US and Canada, France, and the wealthier Caribbean islands.

Emigrants from Haiti have constituted a segment of American and Canadian society since before the independence of Haiti from France in 1804. Many influential early American settlers and black freemen, including Jean Baptiste Point du Sable and W. E. B. Du Bois, were of Haitian origin.

Jean Baptiste Point du Sable, an immigrant from Saint-Domingue (now the Republic of Haiti), founded the first nonindigenous settlement in what is now Chicago, Illinois, the third largest city in the United States. The state of Illinois and city of Chicago declared du Sable the founder of Chicago on 26 October 1968.

Education

The educational system of Haiti is based on the French system. Higher education, under the responsibility of the Ministry of Education, is provided by universities and other public and private institutions.

More than 80% of primary schools are privately managed by nongovernmental organizations, churches, communities, and for-profit operators, with minimal government oversight. According to the 2013 Millennium Development Goals (MDG) Report, Haiti has steadily boosted net enrollment rate in primary education from 47% in 1993 to 88% in 2011, achieving equal participation of boys and girls in education. Charity organizations, including Food for the Poor and Haitian Health Foundation, are building schools for children and providing necessary school supplies.
According to CIA 2015 World Factbook, Haiti's literacy rate is now 60.7% (est. 2015).

The January 2010 earthquake, was a major setback for education reform in Haiti as it diverted limited resources to survival.

Many reformers have advocated the creation of a free, public and universal education system for all primary school-age students in Haiti. The Inter-American Development Bank estimates that the government will need at least US$3 billion to create an adequately funded system.

Upon successful graduation of secondary school, students may continue into higher education. The higher education schools in Haiti include the University of Haiti. There are also medical schools and law schools offered at both the University of Haiti and abroad. Presently, Brown University is cooperating with L'Hôpital Saint-Damien in Haiti to coordinate a pediatric health care curriculum.

Health

In the past, children's vaccination rates have been low , 60% of the children in Haiti under the age of 10 were vaccinated, compared to rates of childhood vaccination in other countries in the 93–95% range. Recently there have been mass vaccination campaigns claiming to vaccinate as many as 91% of a target population against specific diseases (measles and rubella in this case). Most people have no transportation or access to Haitian hospitals.

The World Health Organization cites diarrheal diseases, HIV/AIDS, meningitis, and respiratory infections as common causes of death in Haiti. Ninety percent of Haiti's children suffer from waterborne diseases and intestinal parasites. HIV infection is found in 1.71% of Haiti's population (est. 2015). The incidence of tuberculosis (TB) in Haiti is more than ten times as high as in the rest of Latin America. Approximately 30,000 Haitians fall ill with malaria each year.

Most people living in Haiti are at high risk for major infectious diseases. Food or water-borne diseases include bacterial and protozoal diarrhea, typhoid fever and hepatitis A and E; common vector-borne diseases are dengue fever and malaria; water-contact diseases include leptospirosis. Roughly 75% of Haitian households lack running water. Unsafe water, along with inadequate housing and unsanitary living conditions, contributes to the high incidence of infectious diseases. There is a chronic shortage of health care personnel and hospitals lack resources, a situation that became readily apparent after the January 2010 earthquake. The infant mortality rate in Haiti in 2019 was 48.2 deaths per 1,000 live births, compared to 5.6 per 1,000 in the United States.

After the 2010 earthquake, Partners In Health founded the Hôpital Universitaire de Mirebalais, the largest solar-powered hospital in the world.

Largest cities

Culture

Haiti has a lasting and unique cultural identity, consisting of a blend of traditional French and African customs, mixed with sizable acquirements from the Spanish and indigenous Taíno cultures. Haiti's culture is greatly reflected in its paintings, music, and literature. Galleries and museums in the United States and France have exhibited the works of the better-known artists to have come out of Haiti.

Art

Haitian art is distinctive, particularly through its paintings and sculptures. Brilliant colors, naïve perspectives, and sly humor characterize Haitian art. Frequent subjects in Haitian art include big, delectable foods, lush landscapes, market activities, jungle animals, rituals, dances, and gods. As a result of a deep history and strong African ties, symbols take on great meaning within Haitian society. For example, a rooster often represents Aristide and the red and blue colors of the Haitian flag often represent his Lavalas party. Many artists cluster in 'schools' of painting, such as the Cap-Haïtien school, which features depictions of daily life in the city, the Jacmel School, which reflects the steep mountains and bays of that coastal town, or the Saint-Soleil School, which is characterized by abstracted human forms and is heavily influenced by Vodou symbolism.

In the 1920s the indigéniste movement gained international acclaim, with its expressionist paintings inspired by Haiti's culture and African roots. Notable painters of this movement include Hector Hyppolite, Philomé Oban and Préfète Duffaut. Some notable artists of more recent times include Edouard Duval-Carrié, Frantz Zéphirin, Leroy Exil, Prosper Pierre Louis and Louisiane Saint Fleurant. Sculpture is also practiced in Haiti; noted artists in this form include George Liautaud and Serge Jolimeau.

Music and dance

Haitian music combines a wide range of influences drawn from the many people who have settled here. It reflects French, African and Spanish elements and others who have inhabited the island of Hispaniola, and minor native Taino influences. Styles of music unique to the nation of Haiti include music derived from Vodou ceremonial traditions, Rara parading music, Twoubadou ballads, mini-jazz rock bands, Rasin movement, Hip hop kreyòl, méringue, and compas. Youth attend parties at nightclubs called discos, (pronounced "deece-ko"), and attend Bal. This term is the French word for ball, as in a formal dance.

Compas (konpa) (also known as compas direct in French, or konpa dirèk in creole) is a complex, ever-changing music that arose from African rhythms and European ballroom dancing, mixed with Haiti's bourgeois culture. It is a refined music, with méringue as its basic rhythm. Haiti had no recorded music until 1937 when Jazz Guignard was recorded non-commercially.

Literature

Haiti has always been a literary nation that has produced poetry, novels, and plays of international recognition. The French colonial experience established the French language as the venue of culture and prestige, and since then it has dominated the literary circles and the literary production. However, since the 18th century there has been a sustained effort to write in Haitian Creole. The recognition of Creole as an official language has led to an expansion of novels, poems, and plays in Creole. In 1975, Franketienne was the first to break with the French tradition in fiction with the publication of Dezafi, the first novel written entirely in Haitian Creole; the work offers a poetic picture of Haitian life. Other well known Haitian authors include Jean Price-Mars, Jacques Roumain, Marie Vieux-Chauvet, Pierre Clitandre, René Depestre, Edwidge Danticat, Lyonel Trouillot and Dany Laferrière.

Cinema
Haiti has a small though growing cinema industry. Well-known directors working primarily in documentary film-making include Raoul Peck and Arnold Antonin. Directors producing fictional films include Patricia Benoît, Wilkenson Bruna and Richard Senecal.

Cuisine

Haiti is famous for its creole cuisine (which related to Cajun cuisine), and its soup joumou.

Architecture

Monuments include the Sans-Souci Palace and the Citadelle Laferrière, inscribed as a World Heritage Site in 1982. Situated in the Northern Massif du Nord, in the National History Park, the structures date from the early 19th century. The buildings were among the first built after Haiti's independence from France.

The Citadelle Laferrière, is the largest fortress in the Americas, is located in northern Haiti. It was built between 1805 and 1820 and is today referred to by some Haitians as the eighth wonder of the world.

The Institute for the Protection of National Heritage has preserved 33 historical monuments and the historic center of Cap-Haïtien.

Jacmel, a colonial city that was tentatively accepted as a World Heritage Site, was extensively damaged by the 2010 Haiti earthquake.

Museums

The anchor of Christopher Columbus's largest ship, the Santa María now rests in the Musée du Panthéon National Haïtien (MUPANAH), in Port-au-Prince, Haiti.

Folklore and mythology

Haiti is known for its folklore traditions. Much of this is rooted in Haitian Vodou tradition. Belief in zombies is also common. Other folkloric creatures include the lougarou.

National holidays and festivals

The most festive time of the year in Haiti is during Carnival (referred to as Kanaval in Haitian Creole or Mardi Gras) in February. There is music, parade floats, and dancing and singing in the streets. Carnival week is traditionally a time of all-night parties.

Rara is a festival celebrated before Easter. The festival has generated a style of Carnival music.

Sports

Football (soccer) is the most popular sport in Haiti with hundreds of small football clubs competing at the local level. Basketball and baseball are growing in popularity. Stade Sylvio Cator is the multi-purpose stadium in Port-au-Prince, where it is currently used mostly for association football matches that fits a capacity of 10,000 people. In 1974, the Haiti national football team were only the second Caribbean team to make the World Cup (after Cuba's entry in 1938). They lost in the opening qualifying stages against three of the pre-tournament favorites; Italy, Poland, and Argentina. The national team won the 2007 Caribbean Nations Cup.

Haiti has participated in the Olympic Games since the year 1900 and won a number of medals. Haitian footballer Joe Gaetjens played for the United States national team in the 1950 FIFA World Cup, scoring the winning goal in the 1–0 upset of England.

See also
 Index of Haiti-related articles
 Outline of Haiti

Notes

References

Further reading

 Arthur, Charles. Haiti in Focus: A Guide to the People, Politics, and Culture. Interlink Publishing Group (2002). .
 Dayan, Colin. Haiti, History, and the Gods. University of California Press (1998).
 Ferrer, Ada. Freedom's Mirror: Cuba and Haiti in the Age of Revolution. New York: Cambridge University Press, 2014.
 
 Girard, Philippe. Haiti: The Tumultuous History (New York: Palgrave, September 2010).
 Hadden, Robert Lee and Steven G. Minson. 2010. The Geology of Haiti: An Annotated Bibliography of Haiti's Geology, Geography and Earth Science . US Army Corps of Engineers, Army Geospatial Center. July 2010.
 Heinl, Robert Debs & Nancy Gordon Heinl. Written in Blood: The Story of the Haitian People 1492–1995. University Press of America (2005). .
 Kovats-Bernat, J. Christopher. Sleeping Rough in Port-au-Prince: An Ethnography of Street Children and Violence in Haiti. University Press of Florida (2008). .
 Prichard, Hesketh. Where Black Rules White: A Journey Across and About Hayti. These are exact reproductions of a book published before 1923: (Nabu Press, 5 March 2010); (Wermod and Wermod Publishing Group, 15 October 2012).
 Robinson, Randall. An Unbroken Agony: Haiti, From Revolution to the Kidnapping of a President. Basic Civitas (2007). .
 Wilentz, Amy. The Rainy Season: Haiti Since Duvalier. Simon & Schuster (1990). .
 Marquis, John. Papa Doc: Portrait of a Haitian Tyrant (LMH Publishing, 2007)

External links

 Government
  Prime Minister of Haiti 
  Haitian Parliament
  Ministère de la Santé Publique et de la Population

 General information
 Visit Haiti Official Tourism Website
 
 Haiti at Encyclopædia Britannica.
 Haiti. The World Factbook. Central Intelligence Agency.
 Haiti at UCB Libraries GovPubs.
 A Country Study: Haiti from the US Library of Congress (December 1989).

 Haiti profile from the BBC News.
 Country Profile at New Internationalist.
 Web Site about Safe and Sustainable Water Solutions for Haiti

 
Countries in the Caribbean
Former Spanish colonies
Former French colonies
French Caribbean
Island countries
French-speaking countries and territories
Greater Antilles
Least developed countries
Member states of the Caribbean Community
Member states of the Organisation internationale de la Francophonie
Member states of the United Nations
Republics
States and territories established in 1804
1492 establishments in the Spanish West Indies
Small Island Developing States
1804 establishments in North America
1625 establishments in New France
1804 disestablishments in the French colonial empire
17th-century disestablishments in the Spanish West Indies
Countries in North America